Meslier is originally a French surname, and can refer to the following:

People:
 Jean Meslier (1664–1729), Catholic priest who was discovered after his death to have written a Testament attacking religion.
 Illan Meslier (born 2000), French football goalkeeper who plays for Leeds United.
Places:
Meslières, a village and commune in the Doubs département of eastern France.
'Wine grapes'
 Petit Meslier, a French variety of white wine grape 
 Meslier (grape), another name for the Loire Valley grape Meslier-Saint-François
 Meslier vert, another name for Peurion, a traditional French variety of white wine grape 
 Meslier is also a synonym for the grapes Roublot and Luglienga
Other:
 Asteroid 7062 is named after Jean Meslier, see Meanings of asteroid names (7001-7500).